No Better Time Than Now is the second studio album by glitch hop producer Shigeto. The album was well-received, being ranked number 25 on the 2013 year-end list by XLR8R.

References

2013 albums